is Maki Goto's second single. It was released on September 19, 2001 with the catalog number EPCE-5118.

A remixed version of the song is featured of Goto's first album Makking Gold 1, titled "Afurechau... Be In Love (A Passionate Mix)". A slower re-arrangement of this song, arranged by Yuichi Takahashi, and dubbed the Premium Version, is featured on her first compilation album Goto Maki Premium Best 1. In 2002, an English-language cover ("It Hurts to Be in Love") was recorded by Karyn White for the album Cover Morning Musume Hello! Project!.

Track listing 
All tracks are written and composed by Tsunku.
 
 Arrangement: Akira
 "Like A Game"
 Arrangement: 
 "Afurechau... Be in Love (Instrumental)"

Concert performances 
 Hello! Project 2002 ~Kotoshi mo Sugoizo!~
 Goto Maki First Concert Tour 2003 Haru ~Go! Makking Gold~
 Goto Maki Live Tour 2006 ~G Emotion~

Oricon ranks and sales 

Total sales: 210,360

References

External links 
 Afurechau... Be in Love entry on the Up-Front Works official website
 Projecthello.com lyrics: Afurechau... Be in Love, Like a Game

2001 singles
Songs written by Tsunku
Maki Goto songs
Song recordings produced by Tsunku
2001 songs
Zetima Records singles